Maya Abu Al-Hayat (1980) is a Palestinian novelist, poet, storyteller, and translator, born in Beirut. She has published three novels and three collections of poetry. Her books have gained worldwide recognition, and some of her stories have been translated into different languages. Abu Al-Hayat also worked as an actress and ran the Palestine Writing Workshop. Abu Al-Hayat played a prominent role in children's literature, writing and presenting television programs for children, including "Iftah Ya Simsim," and was distinguished by her writing of children's stories.

Personal life 
Maya Abu Al-Hayat was born in Beirut, Lebanon in 1980, but grew up in Jordan. Her mother is Lebanese and her father Palestinian. She was raised by her aunt.
At some point, she joined her father in Tunis.
In 2003, she received a degree in civil engineering from An-Najah National University in Nablus.

She moved between Amman, Jordan, and Tunis, Tunisia before settling in the occupied city of Jerusalem, with her family. She moved to Jerusalem in 2008. She lives in Jerusalem with her husband and three children.

Career 
Her professional life began as a civil engineer.

Maya then worked as a storyteller and actress; she played a role in the movie "Love, Theft and Other Problems" directed by Muayad Alyan. She also headed the Palestine Writing Association, which specializes in encouraging reading by organizing programs to teach creative writing and also produces stories for children and young adults. In addition, she managed the Palestine Writing Workshop.

She has written novels, collections of poetry, and children’s books. She became the director of the Palestine Writing Workshop in 2013. She has written a number of children’s stories, including the award-winning book The Blue Pool of Questions.

She has written novels, poetry, and stories for children. She published her first novel, "The Sugar Beans," in 2004, followed by her first collection of poetry, "What She Said About It," in 2007. She made her contributions to the field of children's literature, writing for several television programs for children, including Sesame Street (Arabic version, iftah ya simsim), and produced with them a set of stories, including "Masouda," "The Turtle" and "Kiki and Coco in the Clinic." She presented children's programs such as "Farhan and Friends" for many years on Palestine TV. A couple of Maya's stories are published in other languages, including "The Bedtime Story" in Swedish and "The Pool of Blue Questions" in English. Abu Al-Hayat herself has also translated several international novels into Arabic, including "Kolka" by Bengt Olson, "The Old Man Who Broke All Barriers" by Catherine Engelman, and "The Red Bird" by Astrid Lindgren.

Her work has appeared in the Los Angeles Review of Books, Cordite Poetry Review, The Guardian, and Literary Hub. Her writing has been translated into English, French, German, Korean, and Swedish.

She is the editor of The Book of Ramallah, a book of short stories published by Comma Press in its Reading the City Series. She has described Ramallah in the following manner: “It’s a city, but also a bubble.”

Works

Novels 
(2004), “Habat Min Alsukar” (Beads of Sugar): Palestinian House of Poetry. Ramallah
(2011), “Ataba Thakeelat Alruh” (Threshold of Heavy Soul): Ugarit Foundation. 
(2014), “Heen Yaood Abi- Almarhala Alsadisa- Mubtadi” (When my father returns – the sixth stage – a beginner): Asala Publishing. Beirut
(2016), “Fasateen Baitiya Wa Hurub” (Home Dresses and Wars): Al Ahlia for Publishing and Distribution. Amman
(2017), “La Ahad Yarifu Fiata Damih” (No one knows his blood type): Dar Al-Adab. Beirut
(2018), "Glitter": The Mediterranean Publications Library. Baghdad

Children stories 
(2011), “Kisas Ma Kabla Alnaowm”(A Bedtime Story):Tamer Institute for Community Education. Ramallah
(2015), “Mas’ouda Al-Sulfa’ah” (The Turtle Masouda): Al-Hodhud for Publishing and Distribution. Dubai
(2015), “Kiki Wa Kuku Fi Aliyada”(Kiki and Coco in the Clinic): Al Hodhud for Publishing and Distribution. Dubai
(2016), “Birkah Alasila Alzarka” (The Blessing of Blue Questions) Palestine Writing Workshop. Ramallah. Mediterranean Publications Library. Baghdad
(2016), “Falful Fi Baet Algul” (Falful in the House of the Ghoul): Palestine Writing Workshop. Ramallah
(2016), “Asila Fi Hakibat Alsafar” (Questions in a Travel Bag):  Change Association. 2016
(2017), “Bashour”(Bashour) Tagyeer Association
(2017), “Tabakhat Alkalimat” (The Cook of Words), Tagyeer Association
(2020), "Waleed"

Poetry books 
(2007), “Ma Kalathu Fih” (What She Said About It): Palestinian House of Poetry Publications
(2012), “Tilka Alibtisama.. Thalika Alkalb” (That smile..that heart: Raya Publishing and Translation. Haifa

Translations 
(2012), “Altair Alahmar”(The Red Bird): Astrid Lindgren. Tamer Foundation for Community Education
(2017), “Kolka”: Bengt Olson. Dar Al Mona. Giza
“Alajuz Alati Kasarat Kul Alhawajiz” (The Old Man Who Broke All Barriers): Catherine Engelman. Al Mona Publication, Giza

Scholarships 
Maya received the “Horizons” Scholarship from the Arab Culture Fund for the novel “Nobody Knows His Blood Type,” 2011.

Awards
2005 Young Creative Writer Award, Ministry of Culture
2006 Young Writer Award for Poetry, A.M. Qattan Foundation
2016 Best Illustration (in The Blue Lake of Questions), Etisalat Award for Arabic Children’s Literature

Appearances
The Book of Ramallah, Liverpool Arab Arts Festival, March 3, 2021
"Reading the City: The Book of Ramallah," March 16, 2021

References 

Palestinian poets
Living people
1980 births
21st-century Palestinian writers
21st-century Palestinian women writers